The Wellington Phoenix FC–Western United FC rivalry is a rivalry between New Zealand club Wellington Phoenix and Victorian club Western United.

History

Beginning of rivalry
Following the conclusion of the 2018–19 A-League season, Wellington Phoenix manager Mark Rudan was announced as the inaugural manager for expansion team Western United. In the following weeks, Rudan signed three Wellington Phoenix players to the club ahead of their inaugural season; club captain and record appearance holder Andrew Durante, reigning A-League Goalkeeper of the Year Filip Kurto, and Max Burgess. Speculation abounded that Rudan solicited these players during the previous season, while all were still contracted to the Wellington Phoenix. This created animosity between fans of Wellington Phoenix and Rudan, along with Western United themselves.

Early matches
The first meeting between the two teams was an A-League match on 13 October 2019 in Western United's first competitive match. The match, played at Wellington's home ground at Sky Stadium, finished 1–0 to Western United via a goal by Besart Berisha; Durante, Kurto and Burgess all played.

Results

Wellington Phoenix vs. Western United

Western United vs. Wellington Phoenix

Fixture top scorers in the rivalry
Players in bold represent those who are currently playing for Wellington Phoenix or Western United. As of 17 February 2023.

Summary of results

Players who have played for both clubs
Due to the rivalry between the clubs, four players have played for Wellington Phoenix and Western United since 2019. Statistics are sourced from ALeagueStats.com and updated as of 26 December 2022.

Wellington Phoenix, then Western United

Highest attendances
 Wellington 3–0 Western; 24,105 (22 May 2021); Sky Stadium (Wellington Phoenix home)
 Wellington 0–1 Western; 8,254 (13 October 2019); Westpac Stadium (Wellington Phoenix home)
 Wellington 2–0 Western; 7,281 (21 February 2020); Sky Stadium (Wellington Phoenix home)
 Wellington 2–3 Western; 5,203 (13 November 2022); Sky Stadium (Wellington Phoenix home)
 Western 1–3 Wellington; 5,084 (28 December 2019); Mars Stadium (Western United home)

References

Australian soccer rivalries
Wellington Phoenix FC
Western United FC